The 2006 Copa Perú season, the promotion tournament of Peruvian football.

The tournament has 5 stages. The first four stages are played as mini-league round-robin tournaments, except for third stage in region IV, which is played as a knockout stage. The final stage features two knockout rounds and a final four-team group stage to determine the two promoted teams.

The 2006 Peru Cup started with the District Stage on February.  The next stage was the Provincial Stage which started, on June. The tournament continued with the Departamental Stage on July. The Regional Staged followed. The National Stage started on November. The winner and runner-up of the National Stage will be promoted to the First Division.

Departmental Stage
The following list shows the teams that qualified for the Regional Stage.

Regional Stage
The following list shows the teams that qualified for the Regional Stage.

Region I
Region I includes qualified teams from Amazonas, Lambayeque, Tumbes and Piura region.

Group A

Group B

Regional Final

Region II

Region II includes qualified teams from Ancash, Cajamarca, La Libertad and San Martín region.

Group A

Group B

Region III
Region III includes qualified teams from Loreto and Ucayali region.

Region IV
Region IV includes qualified teams from Lima and Callao region. This region played as a knockout cup system and the finalists qualified.

Region V
Region V includes qualified teams from Junín, Pasco and Huancavelica region.

Region VI
Region VI includes qualified teams from Ayacucho, Huánuco and Ica region. Two teams qualified from this stage.

Group A

Group B

Regional Final

Region VII
Region VII includes qualified teams from Arequipa, Moquegua and Tacna region.

Group A

Group B

Playoffs

Region VIII
Region VIII includes qualified teams from Apurímac, Cusco, Madre de Dios and Puno region.

Final Group

National Stage
The National Stage started in November. The winners of the National Stage will be promoted to the First Division.

External links
  Copa Peru 2006

Copa Perú seasons
2006 domestic association football cups
Cop